Mawia is a genus of jellyfish in the family Pelagiidae. It is a monotypic genus with the sole species Mawia benovici. The team who discovered this jellyfish named it benovici after a late colleague, Adam Benovic. Although described based on specimens from the Adriatic Sea, a part of the Mediterranean, it was speculated that these might be transplants (via ballast water) rather than a part of its natural range. A later study found specimens in Senegal, indicating that its natural range possibly is the Atlantic Ocean off West Africa.

References 

Pelagiidae
Animals described in 2014
Monotypic cnidarian genera
Scyphozoan genera